In mathematics, the Laplace transform is a powerful integral transform used to switch a function from the time domain to the s-domain. The Laplace transform can be used in some cases to solve linear differential equations with given initial conditions.

First consider the following property of the Laplace transform:

One can prove by induction that

Now we consider the following differential equation:

with given initial conditions

Using the linearity of the Laplace transform it is equivalent to rewrite the equation as

obtaining

The solution for f(t) is obtained by applying the inverse Laplace transform to 

Note that if the initial conditions are all zero, i.e.

then the formula simplifies to

An example
We want to solve

with initial conditions f(0) = 0 and f′(0)=0.

We note that

and we get

The equation is then equivalent to

We deduce

Now we apply the Laplace inverse transform to get

Bibliography
 A. D. Polyanin, Handbook of Linear Partial Differential Equations for Engineers and Scientists, Chapman & Hall/CRC Press, Boca Raton, 2002. 

Integral transforms
Differential equations
Differential calculus
Ordinary differential equations